District 2 is a house in the Texas House of Representatives. This district was one of the 44 districts created in the 3rd legislature.
 The district represents all of Hunt, Hopkins, Van Zandt Counties. Its current representative is Bryan Slaton. He has been the district's representative since January 14, 2021.

Major cities in the district include Greenville, Sulphur Springs, Commerce, and Canton. 

The district also contains Texas A&M-Commerce, and parts of Lake Tawakoni and Cooper Lake.

List of representatives

Past living Representatives

References

002